The 1969 IIHF European U19 Championship was the second playing of the IIHF European Junior Championships.

Group A 
Played in Garmisch-Partenkirchen, Bavaria, West Germany, from December 26, 1968, to January 2, 1969.  

Poland was relegated to Group B for 1970.

Tournament Awards
Top Scorer: Alexander Maltsev  (17 Points)
Top Goalie: Jiří Crha
Top Defenceman:Börje Salming
Top Forward: Alexander Maltsev

Group B 
Played in Geneva, Switzerland, from March 8–14, 1969.

Switzerland was promoted to Group A for 1970.

References
Complete results
 

Junior
IIHF European Junior Championship tournament
International ice hockey competitions hosted by Switzerland
International ice hockey competitions hosted by West Germany
U19
U19
December 1968 sports events in Europe
January 1969 sports events in Europe
Sports competitions in Bavaria
Sport in Garmisch-Partenkirchen
1960s in Bavaria
1968 in West German sport
1969 in West German sport
March 1969 sports events in Europe
20th century in Geneva
Sports competitions in Geneva